Sweden held a general election on 16 September 1956. This was the sole election between WWII and 1976 which rendered a centre-right majority in the chamber, although the bicameral system and the majority for the leftist parties in the upper chamber rendered a cross-coalition Social Democrat-Farmers' League government.

Results

Regional results

Percentage share

By votes

Constituency results

Percentage share

By votes

Results by municipality
1956 had the postal votes were counted separately from the polling station votes in one unified count across municipalities. The exception to these results are those where the whole constituency was one municipality - namely Gothenburg, Gotland and Stockholm where all postal votes were automatically denoted as part of said municipalities.

Only parties or constellations that got votes in any given constituency are listed.

Blekinge

Dalarna

Dalarna County was known as Kopparberg County at the time, but shared the same borders as in the 21st century.

Kopparberg County

Gothenburg and Bohus

Bohuslän

Gothenburg

Gotland

Gävleborg

Halland

Jämtland

Jönköping

Kalmar

Kristianstad

Kronoberg

Malmöhus

Malmö area

Malmöhus County

Norrbotten

Skaraborg

Stockholm
Stockholm County was divided into Stockholm Municipality and the surrounding county of suburbs or more rural areas.

Stockholm (city)

Stockholm County

Södermanland

Uppsala

Värmland

Västerbotten

Västernorrland

Västmanland

Älvsborg

Älvsborg N

Älvsborg S

Örebro

Östergötland

References

General elections in Sweden